The Kerry county hurling team represents Kerry in hurling and is governed by Kerry GAA, the county board of the Gaelic Athletic Association. The team competes in the Joe McDonagh Cup and the National Hurling League.

Kerry's home ground is Austin Stack Park, Tralee. The team's manager is Stephen Molumphy.

The team last won the Munster Senior Championship in 1891, the All-Ireland Senior Championship in 1891 and has never won the National League.

History
For many years the senior team played in the Junior and Intermediate Championships and had some success. They won All-Ireland titles at Junior level in 1961 and 1972, and won a Munster Championship at junior level in 1956. At Intermediate level they won Munster titles in 1970 and 1973.

Kerry have played in just one Munster Minor Hurling Championship Final, in 1938, when they lost to a Cork team that included the great Christy Ring. They have, however, won and played in a number of All-Ireland B Finals.

In 2003, team made it to the fourth round of the qualifiers only to go down to Limerick 1–14 to 0–24 in Austin Stack Park in Tralee. Along the way they beat Westmeath, Carlow and beaten Ulster finalists Derry. The wins over Westmeath and Carlow represented the first time a Kerry team strung two consecutive Championship victories together. It also marked the first occasion that the Kerry hurling team played more championship games then the Kerry football team.

Kerry have never won the Munster Under-21 Hurling Championship, their most notable achievement in the championship came in 2004 when they ran Limerick to three points at Austin Stack Park. They have, however, won and played in a number of All-Ireland U21 B Championship Finals.

The advent of the Christy Ring Cup has seen Kerry become very competitive. They first made the semi-finals in 2009 where they lost out to Carlow after a replay. They went a step more in 2010 making the final but losing out to Westmeath. In 2011 they again made the final, but this time won the title with victory over Wicklow. From 2013 to 2015 they made the final each year, losing to Down in 2013 and Kildare in 2014 before finally getting over the line thanks to victory over Derry.
 
Kerry won the Division 2A final of the 2015 National Hurling League and advanced to the relegation/promotion match with favourites Antrim, a late point by substitute John Egan saw Kerry advance to Division 1B.

In 2016, Kerry played in the Leinster Senior Hurling Championship round robin along with Carlow, Westmeath and Offaly. During the 2018 Munster Senior Hurling League Kerry recorded their first ever senior victory over Cork beating them 1-23 to 1-13 at Austin Stack Park.

On 8 January 2022 Kerry recorded their first victory over Tipperary 0-17 to 0-14 in the Munster Hurling Cup quarter-final. At the time it was deemed Kerry's greatest hurling success in Austin Stack Park since they beat All-Ireland champions Clare by 3-7 to 1-8 in opening round of 1995-96 NHL.

Current panel

INJ Player has had an injury which has affected recent involvement with the county team.
RET Player has since retired from the county team.
WD Player has since withdrawn from the county team due to a non-injury issue.

Current management team

Appointed in December 2016, with one addition noted.
Manager: Fintan O'Connor
Lead physio: Donnchadh Walsh (from April 2021)

Managerial history

 Éamonn Kelly: -15
 Ciarán Carey: 2015–16
 Fintan O'Connor: 2016–21
 Stephen Molumphy: 2021–

Players

Notable players

Honours

National
All-Ireland Senior Hurling Championship
 Winners (1): 1891

All-Ireland Senior B Hurling Championship
 Winners (3): 1976, 1983, 1986
Joe McDonagh Cup

 Runners-up (3): 2020, 2021, 2022
Christy Ring Cup
 Winners (2): 2011, 2015
 Runners-up (3): 2010, 2013, 2014
All-Ireland Junior Hurling Championship
 Winners (2): 1961, 1972
 Runners-up (2): 1968, 1969
National Hurling League Division 2
 Winners (7): 1956–57, 1961–62, 1966–67, 1967–68, 1978–79, 1998, 2001
National Hurling League Division 2A
 Winners (2): 2014, 2015
National Hurling League Division 3
 Winners (1): 1989–90
National Hurling League Division 3A
 Winners (1): 2010
All-Ireland Under-21 B Hurling Championship
 Winners (9): 2001, 2002, 2006, 2009, 2010, 2011, 2013, 2017, 2018
All Ireland Minor B Hurling Championship
 Winners (10): 1997, 2000, 2001, 2006, 2009, 2012, 2013, 2014, 2015, 2016

Provincial
Munster Senior Hurling Championship
 Winners (1): 1891
 Runners-up (5): 1889, 1890, 1892, 1900, 1908
Munster Intermediate Hurling Championship
 Winners (2): 1970, 1973
 Runners-up (1): 1972
Munster Junior Hurling Championship
 Winners (1): 1956
 Runners-up (2): 1959, 1960
Leinster Minor B Hurling Championship
 Winners (2): 1987, 1988

References

 
County hurling teams